Vareh Zardi (also Romanized as Vareh Zardī; also known as Var Zardī and Nareh Zardī) is a village in Dehpir-e Shomali Rural District, in the Central District of Khorramabad County, Lorestan Province, Iran. At the 2006 census, its population was 117 people in 28 families.

References 

Towns and villages in Khorramabad County